Redvan Ibragimovich Osmanov (born 5 May 1993) is a Russian football player who plays for FC Mashuk-KMV Pyatigorsk. He was born and raised in Crimea, Ukraine and acquired Russian citizenship after the annexation of Crimea.

Club career
He made his debut in the Russian Football National League for FC KAMAZ Naberezhnye Chelny on 10 July 2021 in a game against FC Alania Vladikavkaz.

References

External links
 
 Profile by Russian Football National League

1993 births
People from Simferopol Raion
Living people
Naturalised citizens of Russia
Ukrainian footballers
Russian footballers
Association football forwards
FC Yednist Plysky players
FC Nyva Ternopil players
FC Krymteplytsia Molodizhne players
FC Dynamo Khmelnytskyi players
FC TSK Simferopol players
FC Sevastopol (Russia) players
FC KAMAZ Naberezhnye Chelny players
FC Mashuk-KMV Pyatigorsk players
Ukrainian Second League players
Ukrainian First League players
Crimean Premier League players
Russian Second League players
Russian First League players